The 1953 San Jose State Spartans football team represented San Jose State College during the 1953 college football season.

San Jose State played as an Independent in 1953. The team was led by fourth-year head coach Bob Bronzan, and played home games at Spartan Stadium in San Jose, California. They finished the season with a record of four wins, four losses and one tie. Overall, the team was outscored by its opponents 156–220 for the season.

Schedule

Team players in the NFL
The following San Jose State players were selected in the 1954 NFL Draft.

Notes

References

San Jose State
San Jose State Spartans football seasons
San Jose State Spartans football